Mario Canaro (1903–1974) was a tango musician, a brother of Francisco Canaro.

With his brother Juan Canaro he directed the Sexteto Hermanos Canaro.

Apart from playing music he was active as a composer.

References

1903 births
1974 deaths
Uruguayan tango musicians
Uruguayan musicians
Uruguayan people of Italian descent
Burials at La Chacarita Cemetery